Dane Aaron Rumble (born 9 February 1982) is a New Zealand recording artist. He is a former member of New Zealand hip hop group, Fast Crew.

Background
Rumble was born in Kirwee, Canterbury, and received his secondary education at St Peter's College, Auckland.

Music career

Fast Crew: 1999–2009

Rumble started out in 1999 as the co-founder, writer and co-producer of New Zealand Hip-Hop act Fast Crew. Their debut single "I Got" peaked at number four in the RIANZ New Zealand Singles Chart, and their debut album Set the Record Straight peaked number 11 on the Album Chart. The album produced another two top ten singles, "It's the Incredible" and "Suburbia Streets". In 2008 they released their second album Truth, Lies & Red Tape.
In early 2009 the group disbanded amicably with Rumble pursuing a solo career. He describes his music as "a brand new New Zealand sound".

Dane currently resides in Sydney and extensively tours both Australia and New Zealand.

Solo career

2009–2011: The Experiment
In March 2009, Rumble released his first solo single "Always Be Here". The track debuted on the RIANZ New Zealand Singles Chart at number 33 and peaked at number 13. The single was later certified gold status for selling over 7,500 copies digitally. A second single, "Don't Know What to Do", was released in July, and after a nationwide radio tour, funded by New Zealand On Air, the single reached number 10 on the chart, becoming his first top 10 single as a solo artist.

A third single titled "Cruel" was released in November, and debuted at number 17 on the New Zealand singles chart. The track has since then climbed to number 3, making the track his third consecutive top 20 single, and on top of that, Cruel was certified platinum with sales over 15,000. Rumble spent the summer of 2009/10 with Martin Stevenson, performing on both 'Coca-Cola Bands on Beach Tour' & 'The Woah Oh Oh Tour'.

Rumble's debut solo album, The Experiment was released on 29 March 2010. The album debuted at number 1 on the New Zealand Albums Chart. The following single Everything was released in April and reached no. 20 on the chart.

Ahead of Dane Rumble's 'The Experiment Tour' alongside J.Williams, the two released a collaboration, 'Takes Me Higher' which debuted at Number Two on the New Zealand Singles Chart.

August saw the official release of 'Always Be Here' in Australia. Dane was the No. 1 breakthrough act on Australian radio the week of the single release. 'What Are You Waiting For?' was the fifth single in New Zealand, released digitally on 30 August.

In September 2010 Rumble was nominated for six New Zealand Music Awards. He received the same number of nominations as pop singer Gin Wigmore.

2012–present: Exodus

After taking a brief holiday from touring and music duties, Rumble embarked on a trip to the USA and UK to start work on his second album. Working with various producers and writers including producer Manuel Seal Jr along with Dutch songwriter Louis Schoorl.

On 26 March 2012 Rumble released "Lights Go Out", the lead single from his unreleased second studio album, Exodus.

Artistry and fashion
Rumble has a line of jewellery called Culet, which he contributes to the design of. Stylistically, Rumble is influenced by Kanye West.

Discography

Studio albums

Singles

Music videos

Awards and nominations

References

External links
 

 
1982 births
APRA Award winners
Living people
New Zealand singer-songwriters
People educated at St Peter's College, Auckland
People from North Canterbury